Mazzika Group is a vertically integrated entertainment company founded in Egypt, focused on repackaging and distribution of Arabic content to Arabic-speaking communities and audiences interested in Arab-related content. It was formed in April 2003 by Mohsen Gaber.

Mazzika TV 
Mazzika TV is a subsidiary of Mazzika Group and is managed by a team with over thirty years of experience in the music industry.

Egyptian Producer Mohsen Gaber launched the channels in April 2003 to distribute self-produced video clips and concerts.

Channel content

The channel shows video clips of Arabic music stars, coverage of international concerts, Arabic concerts, interviews with stars, and news programs on the international and Arab music world. Its target demographic is youth.

Catalogs 
Following the sale and break-up of EMI in 2013, Mazzika acquired the entire catalogs of Umm Kulthum, Abdel Halim Hafez, and Mohammed Abdel Wahab.

References

External links
 

Music television channels
Music production companies
Mass media companies of Egypt
IFPI members
Arab record labels
Egyptian record labels
Arabic music
Music organisations based in Egypt
Record labels established in 2003
Universal Music Group